St Levan's Church may refer to:

 St Levan's Church, Porthpean, Cornwall, England
 St Levan's Church, St Levan, Cornwall, England